Prumnacris rainierensis, the cascade timberline grasshopper, is a species of spur-throated grasshopper in the family Acrididae. It is found in the Pacific Northwest United States.

References

External links

 

Melanoplinae